Prionocidaris is a genus of echinoderms belonging to the family Cidaridae.

The genus has almost cosmopolitan distribution.

Species:

Prionocidaris anacachoensis 
Prionocidaris australis 
Prionocidaris baculosa 
Prionocidaris bispinosa 
Prionocidaris callista 
Prionocidaris cookei 
Prionocidaris glandulosa 
Prionocidaris haasti 
Prionocidaris hawaiiensis 
Prionocidaris katherinae 
Prionocidaris malindiensis 
Prionocidaris marchalli 
Prionocidaris neglecta 
Prionocidaris pawpawensis 
Prionocidaris pistillaris 
Prionocidaris popeae 
Prionocidaris praeverticillata 
Prionocidaris scoparia 
Prionocidaris thomasi

References

Cidaridae
Cidaroida genera